Celoriu is one of 28 parishes (administrative divisions) in Llanes, a municipality within the province and autonomous community of Asturias, in northern Spain.

Beaches
 La Palombina
 Las Cámaras
 Los Curas
 Borizu
 San Martín
 Portiellu
 Troenzo

References 

Parishes in Llanes